NGC 3539 is a lenticular galaxy in the constellation Ursa Major. It was discovered in April 1831 by John Herschel. It is a member of the galaxy cluster Abell 1185.

References

External links 
 

3539
Lenticular galaxies
Ursa Major (constellation)
033799